Hayes Gate Football Club was a football club based in Hayes, Greater London, England.

History
Hayes Gate F.C. was founded in 2006 from the former Technicolor Sports & Social Club.  It was privately brought and after substantial investment from the new owners it obtained the FA Charter status and in 2009 they became members of the Combined Counties Football League finishing in the top 10 of Division One.

Despite a 12th-placed finish, the club resigned from the Combined Counties Football League Division One at the end of the 2010–11.

External links
 Official website

Defunct football clubs in England
2006 establishments in England
Association football clubs established in 2006
Association football clubs disestablished in 2011
2011 disestablishments in England
Middlesex County Football League
Defunct football clubs in London
Combined Counties Football League
Sport in the London Borough of Hillingdon